Jeffrey Howard Evans (born 7 August 1954) is a Welsh cricket umpire who has stood in over 200 first-class and List A matches since being named to the ECB Umpires List in 1999. He has also stood in over 100 Twenty20 matches since the inception of the format in 2003. He has also stood as an umpire in four Women's ODIs between 2002 and 2014, as well as the match between India Women and New Zealand Women in the Women's T20 Quadrangular Series in England in 2011. Born in Llanelli, Carmarthenshire, he also umpired matches in the ICL 20-20 Indian Championship 2007–08.

References

External links

1954 births
Living people
Sportspeople from Llanelli
Welsh cricket umpires